Kirill Nikolayevich Belyaev (born 27 August 1997) is a Russian swimmer.

He competed in the 25 km open water event at the 2018 European Aquatics Championships, winning the silver medal. He also won silver at the 2019 World Aquatics Championships in the same competition.

References

1997 births
Living people
Russian male swimmers
Russian male freestyle swimmers
European Aquatics Championships medalists in swimming
World Aquatics Championships medalists in open water swimming
20th-century Russian people
21st-century Russian people